Nguyễn Thủ Tiệp (908–967) was a warlord of Vietnam during the Period of the 12 Warlords. 

Tiệp was a grandson of Nguyễn Hãng, a general from China. Tiệp had an elder brother Nguyễn Khoan and a younger brother Nguyễn Siêu, both were warlords.

Tiệp occupied Tiên Du (mordern Tiên Du District, Bắc Ninh Province). He titled himself Nguyễn Lệnh Công (阮令公) and later changed to Vũ Ninh vương (武寧王).

He was defeated by Đinh Bộ Lĩnh in 967.

References

908 births
967 deaths
10th-century Vietnamese people
People from Bắc Ninh province
Vietnamese people of Chinese descent
Anarchy of the 12 Warlords